Rathausbrücke is a pedestrian bridge which crosses the river Limmat in Zürich, Switzerland. It is colloquially named Gmüesbrugg (Swiss German for "vegetable bridge"), and is a popular public square connecting Limmatquai, and the Weinplatz plaza and the historical Schipfe quarter.

Geography 
Rathausbrücke is situated in the historical center of Zürich, previously known as Celtic-Roman Turicum, on the southeastern foothill of the Lindenhof, near the Lindenhof–Weinplatz–Münsterhof area on the eastern bank of the Limmat. Today, the bridge is used as a public square and pedestrian bridge connecting the Lindenhof Schipfe quarter and the Rathaus quarter.

Transportation 
Although Rathausbrücke is a historically important bridge in Zürich, it is not a nodal point of the present tram railways. Neither the road traffic between General-Guisan-Quai and Limmatquai, nor the traffic from Rämistrasse and Utoquai, use the Rathausbrücke as a primary thoroughfare. The Zürich tram lines 2, 4, and 15, as well as the Zürichsee-Schifffahrtsgesellschaft provide public transportation. Individual transportation usually is limited to commercial traffic. The area is a pedestrian zone, hence, vehicle traffic is limited between lower Limmatquai and the Bellevueplatz square upstream.

Architecture 
The first extensions of the medieval wooden bridge were carried out in 1375 and 1420/21. The medieval bridge was wider than necessary, and housed the mills of the Oetenbach Nunnery, as shown by the altarpiece of the Grossmünster Zwölfbotenkapelle by Hans Leu. Only the breakwaters at the inflow side were built of stone, which can be seen on the Murerplan. All other sections of the bridge consisted mostly of wood. As Schipfe expanded, it became necessary to expand the bridge to accommodate the new traffic. From 1602 to 1605 the bridge was rebuilt with the present dimensions. the bridge was bound on the east by the former Hotel Zum Schwert (now a commercial building), and in the west with a wooden platform made of oak planks. The bridge section between the town hall and the Hauptwache was rebuilt from stone. From 1881 to 1893, the remaining wooden bridge was replaced by a cast-iron construction. The old stalls and shops were slowly replaced by modern commercial buildings, including a café and sanitary installations. In 1972, it once again became necessary to rebuild the bridge. The new design, made of reinforced concrete, was designed by the architect Manuel Pauli and completed in 1973.

History 
The bridge is commonly known as Gmüesbrugg, Swiss German for "vegetable bridge." It received its name after the medieval market on the bridge. However, the first bridge at that location may have been built in the Roman era. In medieval times it was named Untere Brücke, or "lower bridge," as opposed to the Münsterbrücke Limmat crossing called the "upper bridge." It was later it was renamed after the town hall, rathaus that was built between 1692 and 1698.

Points of interest 
Today the plaza serves as a public square, and is a pedestrian zone. Rathausbrücke also serves as the setting for numerous local festivals and public events. At the site of the former Rother Turm the Hotel zum Storchen was built. Opposite of the building, the former seat of the medieval Mülner family is located, the Haus zum Schwert, named after the sword holder on the banner of the Zürich.

Weinplatz 

The square in front of the lower bridge, thereafter the old Kornhausplatz was used as a grain and vegetable store in medieval times, and became in 1630 the public market for local wines, the present Weinplatz square. Despite the relocation of the market to the Münsterhof plaza in 1647, the name is still the same. Some medieval sources mention the Rother Turm building, meaning the "red tower" which was used by the House of Rapperswil as its seat in Zürich in the early 13th century; much later it became a 'literature café' and was demolished. Not yet archaeological proven but suggested by the historians, Weinplatz was also the former civilian harbour of the Celtic-Roman settlement Turicum, and so the term Weinplatz may have an ancient meaning.

Reconstruction 
In July 2015 the city's authorities announced plans to either rebuild or replace the bridge, as the concrete construction of does not meet the modern flood code.

References

External links 

Altstadt (Zürich)
Bridges completed in 1893
Bridges in Zürich
Bridges over the Limmat
Pedestrian bridges in Switzerland
Squares in Zürich
19th-century architecture in Switzerland